was a Japanese figure skater. He won the Japan Figure Skating Championships in 1933–1935, 1937 and 1938. In 1936, he represented Japan at the Winter Olympics, World Championhips and European Championships. He studied and trained at Kwansei Gakuin University.

Results

References

External links

1913 births
Year of death missing
Japanese male single skaters
Olympic figure skaters of Japan
Figure skaters at the 1936 Winter Olympics